A druse is a group of crystals of calcium oxalate, silicates, or carbonates present in plants, and are thought to be a defense against herbivory due to their toxicity. Calcium oxalate (Ca(COO)2, CaOx) crystals are found in algae, angiosperms and gymnosperms in a total of more than 215 families. These plants accumulate oxalate in the range of 3–80% (w/w) of their dry weight through a biomineralization process in a variety of shapes. Araceae have numerous druses, multi-crystal druses and needle-shaped raphide crystals of CaOx present in the tissue. Druses are also found in leaves and bud scales of Prunus, Rosa, Allium, Vitis, Morus and Phaseolus.

Formation 
A number of biochemical pathways for calcium oxalate biomineralization in plants have been proposed. Among these are the cleavage of isocitrate, the hydrolysis of oxaloacetate, glycolate/glyoxylate oxidation, and/or oxidative cleavage of L-ascorbic acid. The cleavage of ascorbic acid appears to be the most studied pathway. The specific mechanism controlling this process is unclear but it has been suggested that a number of factors influence crystal shape and growth, such as proteins, polysaccharides, and lipids or macromolecular membrane structures. Druses may also have some purpose in calcium regulation.

See also 
Idioblast
Raphide
Phytolith
Plant defense against herbivory

References 

Plant physiology